Vella americana is a species of antlion in the family Myrmeleontidae. It is found in North America.

References

Further reading

External links

 

Acanthaclisini
Articles created by Qbugbot
Insects described in 1773
Taxa named by Dru Drury